Mitchell James Richmond III (born June 30, 1965) is an American former professional basketball player. He played collegiately at Moberly Area Community College and Kansas State University. He was a six-time NBA All-Star, a five-time All-NBA Team member, and a former NBA Rookie of the Year. In 976 NBA games, Richmond averaged 21.0 points per game and 3.5 assists per game. Richmond was voted into the Naismith Memorial Basketball Hall of Fame in 2014. His jersey No. 2 was retired in his honor by the Sacramento Kings, for whom he played seven seasons.

College career
Richmond began his college career playing for the Moberly Area Community College Greyhounds. He scored 1,023 points from 1984-1986, before joining the Kansas State Wildcats.

One of the most recognizable players in Kansas State history, Mitch Richmond was a two-year letterman for head coach Lon Kruger from 1986–88.  He helped guide the Wildcats to a 45–20 (.692) record, including a pair of NCAA Tournament appearances and a trip to the 1988 NCAA Midwest Regional Final.  His 1,327 points are the most by a player in a two-year career.

Professional career

Golden State Warriors (1988–1991)
Richmond was drafted 5th overall in the 1988 NBA draft by the Golden State Warriors, following two years at Kansas State, where he averaged 20 points per game, and two years at Moberly Area Community College.

Richmond captured the NBA Rookie of the Year Award in the 1988–89 season, after averaging 22 points per game for the Warriors. He was a key part of Don Nelson's fast-paced offense, focusing on Richmond and teammates Tim Hardaway and Chris Mullin which was dubbed "Run TMC" (the initials of the players' first names and a play on the name of the popular rap group Run-DMC). In addition to the shooting he provided, he complemented Hardaway's passing and fast break skills and Mullin's shooting skills by slashing to the hoop as part of the Warriors' attack.

Sacramento Kings (1991–1998)
After three years of scoring 22+ points a game in Golden State, Richmond, on November 1, 1991, was traded (along with Les Jepsen) to the Sacramento Kings during the 1991–92 season in exchange for the rights to Billy Owens, and became arguably the team's first star since the franchise moved to Sacramento in 1985. Staying with the Kings until 1998, Richmond was the team's leading scorer in each of his 7 seasons there, averaging no fewer than 21.9 points a game each season. Between 1993 and 1998, Richmond was a fixture on the Western Conference's All-Star team, and he won MVP honors at the All-Star Game in Phoenix, in 1995. In the middle of his prime, Richmond was selected to the United States' Olympic team (Dream Team III), earning a gold medal in Atlanta. During his prime, Richmond was recognized as one of basketball's all-time best pure shooters.

Washington Wizards (1998–2001)
Richmond was traded by the Kings, along with Otis Thorpe, to the Washington Wizards for Chris Webber in May 1998, a move that keyed the Kings' transformation from perennial doormat to an elite title contender. However, things did not work out as well for Richmond. In three years with the Wizards, he lost a lot of the shooting touch he displayed as a King, and his days as a regular were numbered after missing half of the 2000–01 season. Richmond's departure from Washington coincided with the Wizards signing Richmond's perennial rival at the shooting guard position, Michael Jordan.

Los Angeles Lakers (2001–2002)
Richmond signed as a free agent with the Los Angeles Lakers, where he played the final year of his career. Playing strictly off the bench, he averaged 4 points a game. He earned an NBA championship ring with the Lakers in 2002 but played sparingly in the postseason, logging 4 minutes overall. In game 4 of the finals, just seconds after making the last basket of his career, Richmond dribbled out the clock to win the title with the Lakers.

National team career
Before coming to the NBA, he played for the U.S. national team at the 1988 Summer Olympics in Seoul, South Korea, winning the bronze medal. He became a member of the team again at the 1996 Summer Olympics in Atlanta, Georgia, U.S. and won the gold medal along with David Robinson, who was also on the U.S. men's national basketball team in 1988.

In August 2010, Richmond played in the NBA Asia Challenge 2010 at Araneta Coliseum in Manila, an exhibition game which pitted NBA legends and NBA Development League players against Philippine Basketball Association stars and legends.

Personal life
Mitch Richmond is the cousin of NFL defensive back Lardarius Webb.

Richmond and his wife Julie have three sons, Phillip, Jerin, and Shane Richmond, and he has a daughter Tearra Gates with Teala Jones.  Shane died in 2019.

Phillip played basketball as a walk-on for the Oregon Ducks from 2014–2016.

Hall of Fame
Mitch Richmond was elected to the Naismith Memorial Basketball Hall of Fame for 2014, and formally entered the Hall on August 8. Richmond was also inducted into the Bay Area Sports Hall of Fame in San Francisco, California in 2016.

NBA career statistics

Regular season

|-
| style="text-align:left;"| 1988–89
| style="text-align:left;"| Golden State
| 79 || 79 || 34.4 || .468 || .367 || .810 || 5.9 || 4.2 || 1.0 || 0.2 || 22.0
|-
| style="text-align:left;"| 1989–90
| style="text-align:left;"| Golden State
| 78 || 78 || 35.9 || .497 || .358 || .866 || 4.6 || 2.9 || 1.3 || 0.3 || 22.1
|-
| style="text-align:left;"| 1990–91
| style="text-align:left;"| Golden State
| 77 || 77 || 39.3 || .494 || .348 || .847 || 5.9 || 3.1 || 1.6 || 0.4 || 23.9
|-
| style="text-align:left;"| 1991–92
| style="text-align:left;"| Sacramento
| 80 || 80 || 38.7 || .468 || .384 || .813 || 4.0 || 5.1 || 1.2 || 0.4 || 22.5
|-
| style="text-align:left;"| 1992–93
| style="text-align:left;"| Sacramento
| 45 || 45 || 38.4 || .474 || .369 || .845 || 3.4 || 4.9 || 1.2 || 0.2 || 21.9
|-
| style="text-align:left;"| 1993–94
| style="text-align:left;"| Sacramento
| 78 || 78 || 37.1 || .445 || .407 || .834 || 3.7 || 4.0 || 1.3 || 0.2 || 23.4
|-
| style="text-align:left;"| 1994–95
| style="text-align:left;"| Sacramento
| 82 || 82 || 38.7 || .446 || .368 || .843 || 4.4 || 3.8 || 1.1 || 0.4 || 22.8
|-
| style="text-align:left;"| 1995–96
| style="text-align:left;"| Sacramento
| 81 || 81 || 36.4 || .447 || .437 || .866 || 3.3 || 3.1 || 1.5 || 0.2 || 23.1
|-
| style="text-align:left;"| 1996–97
| style="text-align:left;"| Sacramento
| 81 || 81 || 38.6 || .454 || .428 || .861 || 3.9 || 4.2 || 1.5 || 0.3 || 25.9
|-
| style="text-align:left;"| 1997–98
| style="text-align:left;"| Sacramento
| 70 || 70 || 36.7 || .445 || .389 || .864 || 3.3 || 4.0 || 1.3 || 0.2 || 23.2
|-
| style="text-align:left;"| 1998–99
| style="text-align:left;"| Washington
| 50 || 50 || 38.2 || .412 || .317 || .857 || 3.4 || 2.4 || 1.3 || 0.2 || 19.7
|-
| style="text-align:left;"| 1999–00
| style="text-align:left;"| Washington
| 74 || 69 || 32.4 || .426 || .386 || .876 || 2.9 || 2.5 || 1.5 || 0.2 || 17.4
|-
| style="text-align:left;"| 2000–01
| style="text-align:left;"| Washington
| 37 || 30 || 32.9 || .407 || .338 || .894 || 2.9 || 3.0 || 1.2 || 0.2 || 16.2
|-
|style="text-align:left;background:#afe6ba;"|†
| style="text-align:left;"| L.A. Lakers
| 64 || 2 || 11.1 || .405 || .290 || .955 || 1.5 || 0.9 || 0.3 || 0.1 || 4.1
|- class="sortbottom"
| style="text-align:center;" colspan="2"| Career
| 976 || 902 || 35.2 || .455 || .388 || .850 || 3.9 || 3.5 || 1.2 || 0.3 || 21.0
|- class="sortbottom"
| style="text-align:center;" colspan="2"| All-Star
| 5 || 1 || 22.0 || .439 || .500 || .500 || 2.4 || 2.6 || 0.2 || 0.0 || 11.4

Playoffs

|-
| style="text-align:left;"| 1989
| style="text-align:left;"| Golden State
| 8 || 8 || 39.3 || .459 || .188 || .895 || 7.3 || 4.4 || 1.8 || .1 || 20.1
|-
| style="text-align:left;"| 1991
| style="text-align:left;"| Golden State
| 9 || 9 || 41.3 || .503 || .333 || .958 || 5.2 || 2.4 || .6 || .7 || 22.3
|-
| style="text-align:left;"| 1996
| style="text-align:left;"| Sacramento
| 4 || 4 || 36.5 || .444 || .348 || .800 || 4.3 || 3.0 || .8 || .0 || 21.0
|-
|style="text-align:left;background:#afe6ba;"|2002†
| style="text-align:left;"| L.A. Lakers
| 2 || 0 || 2.0 || 1.000 || .000 || .500 || .5 || .0 || .0 || .0 || 1.5
|- class="sortbottom"
| style="text-align:center;" colspan="2"| Career
| 23 || 21 || 36.3 || .479 || .302 || .869 || 5.3 || 3.0 || 1.0 || .3 || 19.5

See also
 List of National Basketball Association career scoring leaders
 List of National Basketball Association top rookie scoring averages

References

External links

1965 births
Living people
African-American basketball players
All-American college men's basketball players
American men's basketball players
Basketball coaches from Florida
Basketball players from Florida
Basketball players at the 1988 Summer Olympics
Basketball players at the 1996 Summer Olympics
Golden State Warriors draft picks
Golden State Warriors players
Kansas State Wildcats men's basketball players
Los Angeles Lakers players
Medalists at the 1987 Summer Universiade
Medalists at the 1988 Summer Olympics
Medalists at the 1996 Summer Olympics
Moberly Greyhounds men's basketball players
Naismith Memorial Basketball Hall of Fame inductees
National Basketball Association All-Stars
National Basketball Association players with retired numbers
Olympic bronze medalists for the United States in basketball
Olympic gold medalists for the United States in basketball
Sacramento Kings players
Shooting guards
Sportspeople from Fort Lauderdale, Florida
Universiade medalists in basketball
Universiade silver medalists for the United States
United States men's national basketball team players
Washington Wizards players
21st-century African-American people
20th-century African-American sportspeople